Feroz Khan (25 September 1939 – 27 April 2009), born Zulfiqar Ali Shah Khan, was an Indian actor, film editor, producer and director, who is best known for his work in hindi cinema. He appeared in over 60 films throughout his career, and became one of Bollywood's popular style icons. Khan is best known for his roles in films such as  Aurat (1967), Safar (1970), Mela (1971), Upaasna (1971), Apradh (1972), Khotte Sikkay (1974), Kala Sona (1975), Dharmatma (1975), and Qurbani (1980). He also directed and acted in films such as Janbaaz (1986), Dayavan (1988), Meet Mere Man Ke (1991), Yalgaar (1992), Prem Aggan (1998), Janasheen (2003). He won the Filmfare Best Supporting Actor Award for Aadmi Aur Insaan in 1970, and was honoured with the Filmfare Lifetime Achievement Award in 2000. He is known as Clint Eastwood of India.

Early life
Feroz Khan was born on 25 September 1939 in Bangalore, India, to "Sadiq Ali Khan Tanoli" - an Afghan from Ghazni, Afghanistan and his mother Fatima, had Persian ancestry from Iran.

Khan was educated at Bishop Cotton Boys' School and St. Germain High School, Bangalore. His brothers are Shah Abbas Khan (Sanjay Khan), Shahrukh Shah Ali Khan, Sameer Khan and Akbar Khan. His sisters are Khurshid Shahnavar and Dilshad Begum Sheikh, popularly known as Dilshad Bibi.

After his schooling in Bangalore, he traveled to Bombay (present-day Mumbai) where he made his debut as second lead in Didi in 1960.

Career
Through the early 1960s and 1970s, he made low-budget thrillers opposite starlets. In 1962, he appeared in an English-language film titled Tarzan Goes to India opposite Simi Garewal. His first big hit was in 1965, with Phani Majumdar's Oonche Log (1965), where he was pitted against screen idols Raaj Kumar and Ashok Kumar; he gave a notable sensitive performance. It was followed by more small budget hit films like Samson, Ek Sapera Ek Lootera and Char Darvesh. Again, in the same year, he played a sacrificing lover in the mushy musical Arzoo, starring Sadhana. With this, Khan started to receive A-list second leads. With the film Aadmi Aur Insaan (1969), Khan won his first Filmfare award for Best Actor in a Supporting Role. His other hit films were Khotey Sikkay, Geeta Mera Naam, Pyasi Sham, Shankar Shambhu and Safar. He appeared alongside his real-life brother Sanjay Khan in the hit films Upaasna (1967), Mela (1971) and Nagin (1976).

He became a successful producer and director in 1971 so as to improve his career opportunities as a leading man with his first directorial film Apradh, which was the first Indian movie showing auto racing in Germany; Mumtaaz was his co-star. He produced, directed and starred in the 1975 film Dharmatma, which was the first Indian film to be shot in Afghanistan and was also his first blockbuster hit as producer, director and star and marked the appearance of actress Hema Malini in a glamorous avatar. This movie was inspired by the Hollywood film The Godfather.

He also starred in the Punjabi film Bhagat Dhanna Jat (1974). In 1980, he produced, directed and starred in Qurbani, alongside Vinod Khanna and Zeenat Aman, which was the biggest hit of his career and launched the singing career of iconic Pakistani pop singer Nazia Hassan, with her memorable track "Aap Jaisa Koi". In 1986, he directed and starred in Janbaaz, a box office hit, which some consider to be one of his best movies, featured an all-star cast and possessed great songs and excellent cinematography. In 1988, he directed and starred in Dayavan, which was a remake of an Indian Tamil film titled Nayakan. In 1991, he starred in Meet Mere Man Ke, an outside production which was directed by Mehul Kumar. After directing and starring in Yalgaar (1992), he took a long break from acting for 11 years.

He launched his son Fardeen Khan's career with the 1998 film Prem Aggan, which, however, was a box office bomb. In 2003, he produced and directed Janasheen, also starring alongside his son Fardeen. This film marked his return to acting after 11 years and was also the last film he directed. Apart from sports cars, he also used performing animals in his films — a chimpanzee and lion were used in Janasheen.

He starred alongside his son again in an outside production Ek Khiladi Ek Haseena in 2005. He made his last film appearance in the 2007 comedy film Welcome.

Personal life
Feroz Khan married Sundari Khan in 1965 and they divorced in 1985.

They have two children, Laila Khan (born 1970) and Fardeen Khan (born 1974). Fardeen is married to Natasha Madhwani, daughter of former Bollywood actress Mumtaz. Mumtaz has stated in an interview that Feroz Khan was the most handsome hero in Hindi film industry.

Death and funeral
Feroz Khan died of lung cancer on 27 April 2009 at the age of 69.
He was undergoing treatment at Breach Candy hospital in Mumbai, but expressed his desire to visit his farmhouse in Bangalore. Accordingly, he was brought here, where he died at around 1 a.m.

He was buried in Bangalore near his mother's grave at Hosur Road Shia Kabristan.

Awards and nominations

 Filmfare Best Supporting Actor Award for Aadmi Aur Insaan (1971)
 BFJA Award for Best Supporting Actor for Aadmi Aur Insaan (1971)
 Filmfare Nomination as Best Supporting Actor for Safar (1971)
 Filmfare Nomination as Best Supporting Actor for International Crook (1975)
 Filmfare Lifetime Achievement Award in 2001
 Filmfare Nomination as Best Villain for Janasheen (2004)
 IIFA Award for Best Performance in a Negative Role in 2004
 Zee Cine Award for Lifetime Achievement in 2008
 "Pride of the industry" at the Max Stardust Awards 2009.

Filmography
Actor

Films as Director

References

External links
 

1939 births
2009 deaths
Male actors in Hindi cinema
Male actors from Bangalore
Indian male film actors
Indian male television actors
Indian male voice actors
Indian people of Afghan descent
Indian people of Iranian descent
Indian television presenters
Bishop Cotton Boys' School alumni
Deaths from lung cancer in India
Hindi-language film directors
Male actors in Kannada television
20th-century Indian male actors
21st-century Indian male actors
20th-century Indian film directors
21st-century Indian film directors
Film directors from Bangalore
Hindi film producers
Film producers from Bangalore
Indian Shia Muslims
International Indian Film Academy Awards winners
Filmfare Awards winners
Filmfare Lifetime Achievement Award winners